Wildwood Dam is a dam located on Trout Creek in Perth South, Ontario, which flows into the North Thames River in the Town of St. Marys. Wildwood Dam is designed for flood control and flow augmentation purposes.

It cost: $2 million to build—Provincial government 37.5%, Federal government 37.5%, UTRCA 25% (benefitting watershed municipalities)

It is one of three dams on the Thames River (Ontario) and its tributaries.

See also
List of reservoirs and dams in Canada 
Upper Thames River Conservation Authority
 Pittock Dam (Thames River)
 Fanshawe Dam (Thames River)

References

Dams in Ontario
Buildings and structures in London, Ontario
Dams completed in 1965